Pilocamptus is a genus of copepods belonging to the family Canthocamptidae.

Species

Species:

Pilocamptus africanus 
Pilocamptus alluaudi 
Pilocamptus georgevitchi

References

Copepods